Mišović is a Serbian surname, derived from the male given name Mišo. It may refer to:

Dragiša Mišović, medical professor
Nenad Mišović, assassin of Ratko Djokić
Jordan Misja (Mišović), one of the three heroes of Skadar
Radmilo Mišović, Yugoslav basketball player
Milan Mišović, general manager of Metalac company
Sanja Mišović, Montenegrin chess player
Robert Mišović, Serbian film director
a brotherhood of the Vasojevići tribe

See also
Mišević, settlement in Serbia
Mišić, surname
Mišković, surname
Mišovice, settlement in Czech Republic

Serbian surnames